The Academy of Military Sciences is the highest-level research institute of the People's Liberation Army of China. It is headquartered in Beijing. Its president is General Yang Xuejun (since June 2017) and Lt. General Fang Xiang is the political commissar.

Functions 
As stated in its official description, the AMS researches issues related to “national defence, armed forces development and military operations.” It works in consultation with the Central Military Commission and the Joint staff Department. More broadly, it coordinates research conducted by the various PLA institutions.

Also, according to Bates Gill and James Mulvenon, "AMS researchers write reports for the military leadership, ghost-write speeches for top military leaders, and serve on temporary and permanent leading small groups as drafters of important documents like the Defence White Paper. The AMS also conducts analysis on foreign militaries, strategy and doctrine, and has consistently taken the lead role in the study of the future of warfare."

The National Defense Policy Research Center of the AMS is also part of the drafting of China's Defense White Paper.

History and organization 

The AMS was founded in March 1958 and as of 2002, its staff included approximately 500 researchers, making it the largest research institution in the PLA. Although the AMS has been reorganized multiple times since its founding, as of August 2008, it contained the following administrative divisions:
 Department of Research Directive
 Academy Affair Department
 Political Department
 Graduate Department (School)
 Department of War Theory and Strategic Research
 Department of Operations Theory and Doctrines Research
 Department of Armed Forces Development Research
 Department of World Military Research
The academy also maintains a research magazine, a publishing house, and a library.

Members and staff
Major General Yao Yunzhu, director of China-America Defense Relations  
Major General Chen Zhou, a senior researcher and a key author of the 2013 The Diversified Employment of China’s Armed Forces paper
Dr. Lu Jinghua, Research Fellow, Center on China-America Defense Relations

References

External links 
 Official website

 
Military academies of China
People's Liberation Army
Educational institutions established in 1958
1958 establishments in China
Universities and colleges in Beijing
Military research of China